Fannie Heaslip Lea (October 30, 1884 – January 13, 1955) was an American author and poet, best known for her poem "The Dead Faith".

Biography
Fannie (sometimes spelled Fanny) Heaslip Lea, the daughter of newspaperman James J. Lea and Margaret Heaslip, was born in New Orleans, Louisiana. After attending public schools in New Orleans, she matriculated to H. Sophie Newcomb Memorial College in New Orleans, where she received a B.A. in 1904, and did graduate work in English at Tulane University in Louisiana for two years after.

Until her marriage in 1911, she wrote feature articles for New Orleans daily newspapers and short stories for magazines such as Harper's, a short story, "Little Anna and the Gentleman Adventurer", in the 1910 The Century Magazine and Woman's Home Companion. Afterwards, she moved with her husband, Hamilton Pope Agee, to Honolulu. Her first novel, Quicksands, was published in this year. She continued to write through the birth of a daughter, Anne Worthen. She divorced Agee in 1926 and moved to New York, publishing 19 novels and more than 100 stories, poems, and essays in various newspapers and journals, until her death in 1955.

Lea wrote several plays. Her first, Round-About, was produced in 1929 by the New York Theatre Assembly.

Her papers are housed in the University of Oregon Library in Eugene, Oregon.

Bibliography

"The Dead Faith" (1908)
Quicksands (1911)
Wild Goose Chance (1929)
Verses for Lovers, and Some Others (1955)

Sources

References

External links
 Fannie Heaslip Lea at the FictionMags Index

1884 births
1955 deaths
American women writers
H. Sophie Newcomb Memorial College alumni
Tulane University alumni